This article contains an overview of the sport of athletics, including track and field, cross country and road running, in the year 2002.

There was no primary championships that season, although continental championships were held in Africa, Asia and Europe. The foremost athletics competitions at games events occurred at the 2002 Commonwealth Games, the 2002 Asian Games and the 2002 CAC Games. The 2002 IAAF World Cup was the major global outdoor track and field event.

Paula Radcliffe was among the season's top performers, having set world records at the London and Chicago Marathons, as well becoming European and Commonwealth champion on the track.

Major events

World

World Cross Country Championships
IAAF World Cup
World Half Marathon Championships
World Race Walking Cup
World Junior Championships in Athletics
Grand Prix Final
IAAF Golden League
World Marathon Majors
Commonwealth Games

Regional

African Championships
Asian Championships
Asian Junior Championships
Asian Games
Balkan Games
Central American and Caribbean Games
European Athletics Championships
European Cross Country Championships
European Mountain Running Championships
European Cup
Ibero-American Championships
Micronesian Games
Oceania Athletics Championships
Oceania Cross Country Championships
South American Games
South American U23 Championships
South American Cross Country Championships
West Asian Games

National
2002 Lithuanian Athletics Championships

World records

Men

   None in 2002

Women

Awards

Men

Women

Men's Best Year Performances

400m Hurdles

3,000m Steeplechase

Race Walking

Pole Vault

Hammer Throw

Decathlon

Women's Best Year Performances

100 metres

200 metres

Half Marathon

Race Walking

100m Hurdles

400m Hurdles

3,000m Steeplechase

High Jump

Pole Vault

Hammer Throw

Heptathlon

Marathon

Men's competition

Commonwealth Games

Best Year Performances

Women's competition

Commonwealth Games

Best Year Performances

Deaths
 March 7 — Franziska Rochat-Moser (35), Swiss long-distance runner
 March 22 — Marcel Hansenne (85), French middle-distance runner
 March 27 — Tadeusz Rut (70), Polish hammer thrower
 May 26 — Mamo Wolde (69), Ethiopian runner
 June 17 — Willie Davenport (59), American hurdler
 June 20 — Tinus Osendarp (86), Dutch athlete
 August 1 — Theo Bruce (79), Australian long jumper
 August 12 — Knud Lundberg (82), Danish multi-talented sportsman
 August 31 — Joe McCluskey (91), American athlete
 September 18 — Bob Hayes (59), American sprinter and American football player
 November 15 — Sohn Kee-Chung (90), Korean marathoner
 November 18 — Kim Gallagher (38), American athlete

References
 ARRS

 
Athletics (track and field) by year